Riot On Redchurch Street is an London-based musical drama directed by Trevor Miller and starring Sam Hazeldine, Alysson Paradis, Jesse Birdsall and Les McKeown. The soundtrack includes four original songs written by Siobhan Fahey and is scheduled for international release, Summer 2012.

Plot
Set in the hipster-underworld of Shoreditch, East London, 'Riot' depicts a bisexual love-triangle that unravels between a British Rock and Roll Manager (Hazeldine) and two of his clients - a French pop-singer (Paradis) and the front-man from a local punk band (played by newcomer, Rhys James).

As racial tension bubbles on the streets of Shoreditch, stragglers outside a gig ignite a full-blown race riot on the steps of the Redchurch Street mosque and before the night is over our love-triangle will end in blood and redemption.

Cast
Sam Hazeldine as Ray Mahoney
Alysson Paradis as Astrid 'Angel' Renaud
Jesse Birdsall as Dapper John MacKay
 Rhys James as Danny Reed
Les McKeown as himself
Lois Winstone as Carole Ecclestone
Tam Dean Burn as Jerry Graff
Johnny Borrell as Johnny The Doorman
 The Fabulous Russella as Terry Crystal
Tim Noble and Sue Webster as Redchurch Street Scum

References
MovieHouse builds a slate, Cannes 2011...

External links
 
 

2012 films
British drama films
British independent films
2010s English-language films
2010s British films